The International Committee of Historical Sciences / Comité international des Sciences historiques (ICHS / CISH) is the international association of historical scholarship. It was established as a non-governmental organization in Geneva on May 14, 1926. It is composed of national committees and international affiliated organizations committed to research and to scholarly publication in all areas of historical study. There are currently 51 national committees and 30 international associations members of the CISH.

Its main activity is the organisation of an international conference, the "International Congress of Historical Sciences".

The most recent (22nd) took place in August 2015 in Jinan (China). The 23rd Congress was planned for June 2020 in Poznan (Poland) but has been postponed until 2021.

It awards the CISH-Jaeger-LeCoultre History Prize to "historian who has distinguished herself or himself in the field of history by her/his works, publications or teaching, and has significantly contributed to the development of historical knowledge". The last prize (2015) went to Serge Gruzinski (École des hautes études en sciences sociales and CNRS, Paris, France).

Bibliography
 Karl Dietrich Erdmann, Toward Global Community of Historians. The International Congresses and the International Committee of historical sciences 1898-2000, Berghahn Books, 2005.

References

External links

Scientific organizations established in 1926
1926 establishments in Switzerland
International scientific organizations
History organizations